Elaeocarpus thelmae is a species of flowering plant in the family Elaeocarpaceae and is endemic to north-east Queensland. It is a tree, often with buttress roots at the base of the trunk, egg-shaped to elliptic leaves with many hairy domatia, densely rusty-hairy flowers, and blackish, oval fruit.

Description
The leaves have many hairy domatia near vein junctions and have obscure serration on the edges. The four or five petals are about the same size as the sepals with four to six lobes on the tip, and there are fifty to sixty densely-packed stamens.

Taxonomy
Elaeocarpus thelmae was first formally described in 1984 by Bernard Hyland and Mark James Elgar Coode in the Kew Bulletin.

Distribution and habitat

Conservation status
This quandong is listed as of "least concern" under the Queensland Government Nature Conservation Act 1992.

References

Oxalidales of Australia
thelmae
Flora of Queensland
Plants described in 1984
Endemic flora of Australia